Acleris crataegi is a species of moth of the family Tortricidae. It is found in South Korea, China (Hunan, Heilongjiang), Japan and Russia (Amur).

The wingspan is about 15 mm.

The larvae feed on Crataegus pinnatifida.

References

Moths described in 1964
crataegi
Moths of Asia